Mwotlap (pronounced ; formerly known as Motlav) is an Oceanic language spoken by about 2,100 people in Vanuatu. The majority of speakers are found on the island of Motalava in the Banks Islands, with smaller communities in the islands of Ra (or Aya) and Vanua Lava, as well as migrant groups in the two main cities of the country, Santo and Port Vila.

Mwotlap was first described in any detail in 2001, by the linguist Alexandre François.

Volow, which used to be spoken on the same island, may be considered a dialect or a separate language.

The language

Name 
The language is named after the island.

Geographic distribution 
Mwotlap is spoken by about 2,100 people in the Banks Islands, in the North of Vanuatu. Among them, 1,640 live on the island of Mota Lava and its neighbor island, Ra. It is also spoken by a few hundred people living elsewhere in Vanuatu:
 Vanua Lava, particularly in the northeast
 Several other northern Vanuatu islands including Ureparapara, Gaua, and Ambae
 Port-Vila, the capital of Vanuatu
 Luganville, the country's second largest city, located on the island of Espiritu Santo

Classification 
Mwotlap belongs to the Austronesian language family, which includes more than 1,200 languages. Inside its family, Mwotlap is an Oceanic language, descending from the hypothetical common ancestor of all Oceanic languages, Proto-Oceanic. More specifically, it is a Southern Oceanic language.

History 
Robert Henry Codrington, an Anglican priest who studied Melanesian societies, first described Mwotlap in 1885. While focusing mainly on Mota, Codrington dedicated twelve pages of his work The Melanesian Languages to the "motlav" language. Despite being very short, this description can be used to show several changes that occurred in Mwotlap during the 20th century, such as the change of r to y. Furthermore, Codrington described Volow, a language closely related to Mwotlap (sometimes even considered a dialect of Mwotlap). Volow, almost extinct today, was spoken in the east of Mota Lava, in the area of Aplow.

Phonology 
Because Mwotlap has been passed down by oral tradition, it has no official writing system. This article uses the orthography devised by linguist Alexandre François, based on the Latin alphabet.

Mwotlap contrasts 16 consonant phonemes.
{| class="wikitable" style="text-align:center"
|+ Consonants
!colspan="2"|
! Labiovelar
! Bilabial
! Alveolar
! Dorsal
! Glottal
|-
!colspan="2"| Nasal
|  
|  
|  
|  
|
|-
!rowspan="2"| Stop
! voiceless
|  
|
|  
|  
|
|-
! prenasalized
|
|  
|  
|
|
|-
!colspan="2"| Fricative
|
|  
|  
|  
|  
|-
!colspan="2"| Approximant
|  
|
|  
|  
|
|}

Mwotlap has 7 phonemic vowels, which are all short monophthongs, with no diphthongs being present in the language.

{| class="wikitable" style="text-align:center"
|+ Vowels
!
! Front
! Back
|-
!Close
|  
|  
|-
!Near-close
|  
|  
|-
!Open-mid
|  
|  
|-
!Open
| colspan="2"|  
|}

Stress always falls on the last syllable of a word.

Prosody 
Mwotlap is not tonal. Stress falls on the last syllable of a word or syntagma.

Morphophonology

Syllables 
Mwotlap's syllable structure is (C)V(C). This means that no more than two consonants can follow each other within a word and that no word can start or finish with more than one consonant. Recent loanwords, like skul (from English school), are exceptions to this structure.

When a root beginning with two constants forms the beginning of a word, an epenthetic vowel (the same as the next vowel) is inserted between the two consonants. For example, the root tron̄ ("drunk") can form the following:
 me-tron̄ [mɛt.rɔŋ] ("[he] got drunk"): the consonants t and r belong to two different syllables;
 toron̄ [tɔ.rɔŋ] ("[they are] getting drunk"): the insertion of a vowel between t and r is necessary to prevent the syllable from starting with two consecutive consonants.

Vowel copying 
Vowel copying is the tendency of certain prefixes to copy the first vowel of the following word. Notable vowel copying prefixes include the article na-, the locative le-, and te-, a prefix used to form adjectives describing origin. These prefixes form nō-vōy ("volcano"), ni-hiy ("bone"), and to-M̄otlap ("from Mota Lava"), but also na-pnō ("island") and na-nye-k ("my blood"). Words stems beginning with two consonants do not permit vowel copying. Thus the stems  and  allow their vowel to be copied, while the stems  and  do not.

Syntax
Mwotlap is an SVO language: the word order of a sentence is fixed and is always subject-verb-complement-adverbial.

The system of personal pronouns contrasts clusivity, and distinguishes four numbers (singular, dual, trial, plural). Human nouns also have four numbers; as for non-human nouns, they do not inflect for number and are expressed as singulars.

Spatial reference in Mwotlap is based on a system of geocentric (absolute) directionals, which is in part typical of Oceanic languages, and in part innovative.

References

Pages from: François,  Alexandre (2001), Contraintes de structures et liberté dans l'organisation du discours. Une description du mwotlap, langue océanienne du Vanuatu. PhD dissertation, Université Paris-IV Sorbonne. 1078 pp.

Sources

Main references
 François,  Alexandre (2001), Contraintes de structures et liberté dans l'organisation du discours. Une description du mwotlap, langue océanienne du Vanuatu. PhD dissertation, Université Paris-IV Sorbonne. 1078 pp.

.

Other references

 .

 
.

External links

  Introduction to Mwotlap and Motalava culture, photos, maps, songs, myths and stories
 Presentation of the Mwotlap language, with links to audio recordings in open access, by A. François (Pangloss Collection, CNRS).
 Access to several stories in Mwotlap (with English and French translations, by A. François).
 Nalne Genyon Ta Melanesia A Liturgy for Melanesia in Mwotlap (1970)

Banks–Torres languages
Languages of Vanuatu
Torba Province